Lagnasco is a comune (municipality) in the Province of Cuneo in the Italian region Piedmont, located about  south of Turin and about  north of Cuneo.

Lagnasco borders the following municipalities: Manta, Saluzzo, Savigliano, Scarnafigi, and Verzuolo.

The main attractions is the Tapparelli d'Azeglio castle, housing a series of grotesque Renaissance paintings by Piero Dolce.

References

External links 
 

Cities and towns in Piedmont